Naogaon-1 is a constituency represented in the Jatiya Sangsad (National Parliament) of Bangladesh from 2008 by Sadhan Chandra Majumder of the Awami League.

Boundaries 
The constituency encompasses Porsha, Niamatpur, and Sapahar upazilas.

Members of Parliament

References

External links
 

Parliamentary constituencies in Bangladesh